Gojko (Serbian script: Гојко) is a masculine given name of an old South Slavic origin. Meaning is little hidden but is connected with peace, as Pacific. It may refer to:

Gojko Balšić, 15th-century nobleman
Gojko Berkuljan (1923–1989), painter
Gojko Bervar (born 1946), Slovenian journalist
Gojko Đogo (born 1940), Serbian poet
Gojko Kačar (born 1987), Serbian footballer
Gojko Kenda, Slovene musician
Gojko Koprivec (born ), Slovenian politician
Gojko Mitić (born 1940), German film star from Serbian origin
Gojko Onič (born ), Slovene financial manager
Goja Pajagić Bregar, scientist and Slovene museum curator 
Gojko Pijetlović (born 1983), Serbian water polo goalkeeper
Gojko Stanič (born 1940), Slovene politician and journalist
Gojko Šušak (1945–1998), Croatian politician
Gojko Vučinić (born 1970), Montenegrin handballer
Gojko Zalokar (born 1962), Slovene organiser (sport)
Gojko Zec (1935–1995), Serbian footballer
Gojko Zupan (1957–), Slovenian Art historian
Gojko Marić (born 1991), Serbian Musician

See also
Gojković

Slavic masculine given names
Serbian masculine given names